Päivi Tommola (born 1971) is a Finnish mountain bike orienteering competitor, World Champion and European Champion. She won individual gold medals at the 2002 and 2005 World Championships, and gold medals in the relay in 2002, 2004 and 2007.

2002-2005
Tommola competed at the very first World Championships, in Fontainebleau in 2002, where she won a gold medal in the long distance. She also won a gold medal in the relay with the Finnish team, together with Kirsi Korhonen and Mervi Väisänen. At the 2004 World Championships in Ballarat she won a silver medal in the long distance, behind winner Anke Dannowski from Germany, and a gold medal in the relay together with Maija Lång and Kirsi Korhonen. She won a gold medal in the long distance at the 2005 World Championships in Banská Bystrica.

2006-2008
When the 2006 World Championships were held in Joensuu in Finland, Tommola won a silver medal in the relay with the Finnish team. She placed seventh in the middle distance and sixth in the long distance. At the European Championships in Warsaw in August-September 2006, the Finnish team won gold medals in the relay, with Tommola, Ingrid Stengård and Maija Lång on the team. At the European Championships in Castelfiorentino 2007 Tommola won gold medals in both the long distance and the middle distance, and also a silver medal in the relay. The 2007 World Championships were held in Nove Mesto in August, and the Finnish relay team won gold medals with Taija Jäppinen, Ingrid Stengård and Päivi Tommola. She won a bronze medal in the middle distance at the 2008 World Championships in Ostróda.

See also
 Finnish orienteers
 List of orienteers
 List of orienteering events

References

Finnish orienteers
Female orienteers
Finnish female cyclists
Mountain bike orienteers
1971 births
Living people
Place of birth missing (living people)
Finnish mountain bikers